Anna Bergman (born 5 May 1948) is a Swedish former actress. She is the daughter of film and theatre director Ingmar Bergman and choreographer-director Ellen Lundström, sister to Eva, Jan, and Mats Bergman (twin); and half-sister to Daniel Bergman and Linn Ullmann.

Bergman mostly appeared as a performer in several British sex comedies during the late 1970s including the title role in Penelope Pulls It Off (1975), Adventures of a Taxi Driver (1976), Intimate Games (1976), Come Play with Me (1977) and What's Up Superdoc! (1978).

Later she appeared in small roles in more mainstream films including The Wild Geese (1978), Licensed to Love and Kill (1979), Nutcracker (1982), and her father's 1982 film Fanny and Alexander. She also appeared as Swedish au pair Ingrid Svenson in series' 2 and 4 of the British situation comedy Mind Your Language.

References

Additional sources 
 Simon Sheridan. Keeping the British End Up: Four Decades of Saucy Cinema (3rd Edition). Reynolds & Hearn Books, 2007.
 Simon Sheridan. X-Rated - Adventures of an Exploitation Filmmaker. Reynolds & Hearn Books, 2008.
 Anna Bergman with Gun Årestad. Inte Pappas Flicka (autobiography). Höganäs: Bra Bok, 1988. .
 Anna Bergman. Crooks (novel). AuthorHouse, 2009. .

External links

1948 births
Living people
Actors from Gothenburg
Swedish actresses
Swedish twins